Seva Sadan can refer to:

 Sevasadanam, a 1938 Tamil film directed by K. Subramanyam
 Gandhi Seva Sadan, a Kathakali institution located in Perur village of Kerala, India
 Bazaar-e-Husn, a novel by Prem Chand, published in Hindi under the title Seva Sadan
 Seva Sadan, an Indian women's social and training institution founded by Ramabai Ranade